Harold Fiskari (September 14, 1928 – November 21, 2012) was a Canadian ice hockey player with the East York Lyndhursts. He won a silver medal at the 1954 World Ice Hockey Championships in Stockholm, Sweden.

References

1928 births
2012 deaths
Canadian ice hockey defencemen
East York Lyndhursts players